The 2016–17 I-League U18 Final Round will feature 12 teams qualified from first round. The teams are drawn into three groups of four teams. Three group winners and one best second placed team enter semifinal. Matches will be played on various grounds in Kolkata.

Group stage

Group A

Group B

Group C

Ranking of runner-up teams

Knock–out stage

Bracket

Semi-finals

Final

References

External links
 I-League U18 on the AIFF website.

I-League U18 seasons
2016–17 in Indian football